Prunetto is a comune (municipality) in the Province of Cuneo in the Italian region Piedmont, located about  southeast of Turin and about  east of Cuneo.
The Communities are predominantly farming based.

Prunetto borders the following municipalities: Castelletto Uzzone, Gorzegno, Gottasecca, Levice, Mombarcaro, and Monesiglio.

Demographic evolution

References

Cities and towns in Piedmont